The 2009 Michelin Ginetta G50 Cup was the second Ginetta G50 Cup. The season began at Brands Hatch on 4 April and finished after 28 races over 10 rounds also at Brands Hatch on 4 October, supporting rounds of the British Touring Car Championship.

Teams and drivers

Race calendar and results
All rounds were held in the United Kingdom.

Championship standings

References

External links
 Official website
 tsl-timing

Ginetta G50